If You Want Blood EP is the preceding EP by Matt Pond PA to his seventh studio album, Last Light.

Track listing
"Reading" – 3:27
"Magic Boyfriend" – 2:25
"Everything Until The East Coast Ends" – 5:48
"If You Live" – 5:03
"If You Want Blood" – 4:06

Personnel
Dan Crowell – drums, percussion, organ
Steven Jewett – guitar, bass, banjo
Matthew Pond – guitar, vocals
Brian Pearl – piano, guitar, organ, wurlitzer
Chris Hansen – piano
Thom Monahan – guitar, vocals, keyboards
John O'Mahony – guitar
Jane Scarpantoni – cello
David Gold – viola
Antoine Silverman – violin
Max Moston – violin

Technical personnel
Produced by Matthew Pond, John O'Mahony, and Thom Monahan
Engineered by John O'Mahony, Chris Hansen and Thom Monahan
Mixed by John O'Mahony

Matt Pond PA EPs
2007 EPs